Carlos Molinares Saumeth (born 23 June 1956) is a Colombian former footballer who played as a forward. He competed in the men's tournament at the 1980 Summer Olympics. At club level, he represented Atlético Junior. Molinares was known for his speed and his dribbling.

Personal life
Molinares has four children.

References

Living people
1956 births
Colombian footballers
Association football forwards
Colombia international footballers
Olympic footballers of Colombia
Footballers at the 1980 Summer Olympics
Categoría Primera A players
Atlético Junior footballers
Place of birth missing (living people)